This is a list of diseases starting with the letter "B".

Ba

Bab–Bam
 Baber's syndrome
 Babesiosis
 Bacillus cereus infection
 Bacterial endocarditis
 Bacterial food poisoning
 Bacterial gastroenteritis
 Bacterial meningitis
 Bacterial pneumonia
 Bacterial vaginosis
 Bagatelle–Cassidy syndrome
 Bahemuka–Brown syndrome
 Baker–Vinters syndrome
 Baker–Winegard syndrome
 Balantidiasis
 Ballard syndrome
 Ballistophobia
 Balo disease
 Balo's concentric sclerosis
 Bamforth syndrome

Ban
 BANF acoustic neurinoma
 Bangstad syndrome
 Banki syndrome
 Bannayan–Zonana syndrome
 Banti's syndrome
 Bantu siderosis

Bar
 Baraitser–Brett–Piesowicz syndrome
 Baraitser–Rodeck–Garner syndrome
 Barber–Say syndrome
 Barbiturate dependence
 Barbiturate overdose
 Bardet–Biedl syndrome
 Bardet–Biedl syndrome, type 1
 Bardet–Biedl syndrome, type 2
 Bardet–Biedl syndrome, type 3
 Bardet–Biedl syndrome, type 4
 Bare lymphocyte syndrome 2
 Bare lymphocyte syndrome
 Baritosis
 Barnicoat–Baraitser syndrome
 Barrett syndrome
 Barrow–Fitzsimmons syndrome
 Barth syndrome
 Bartonella infections
 Bartsocas–Papas syndrome
 Bartter syndrome, antenatal form
 Bartter syndrome, classic form

Bas–Baz
 Basal cell carcinoma
 Basal cell nevus anodontia abnormal bone mineralization
 Basal ganglia diseases
 Basan syndrome
 Basaran–Yilmaz syndrome
 Basedow's coma
 Basilar artery migraines
 Basilar impression primary
 Bassoe syndrome
 Bathophobia
 Batrachophobia
 Battaglia–Neri syndrome
 Batten disease
 Batten–Turner muscular dystrophy
 Baughman syndrome
 Bazex–Dupré–Christol syndrome
 Bazopoulou–Kyrkanidou syndrome

Bc–Bd
 B-cell lymphomas
 Bd syndrome

Be

Bea–Bel
 Beals syndrome
 Beardwell syndrome
 Bébé–Collodion syndrome
 Becker disease
 Becker's muscular dystrophy
 Becker's nevus
 Beemer–Ertbruggen syndrome
 Beemer–Langer syndrome
 Behcet syndrome
 Behr syndrome
 Behrens–Baumann–Dust syndrome
 Bejel
 Bellini–Chiumello–Rinoldi syndrome
 Bell's palsy

Ben–Ber
 Ben Ari Shuper Mimouni syndrome
 Benallegue–Lacete syndrome
 Bencze syndrome
 Benign astrocytoma
 Benign autosomal dominant myopathy
 Benign congenital hypotonia
 Benign essential blepharospasmass
 Benign essential tremor syndrome
 Benign familial hematuria
 Benign familial infantile convulsions
 Benign familial infantile epilepsy
 Benign fasciculation syndrome
 Benign lymphoma
 Benign mucosal pemphigoid
 Benign myoclonic epilepsy
 Benign paroxysmal positional vertigo
 Bentham Driessen Hanveld syndrome
 Benzodiazepine dependence
 Benzodiazepine overdose
 Benzodiazepine withdrawal syndrome
 Berardinelli–Seip congenital lipodystrophy
 Berdon syndrome
 Berger disease
 Beriberi
 Berlin breakage syndrome
 Berry aneurysm, cirrhosis, pulmonary emphysema, and cerebral calcification
 Berylliosis
 Beta ketothiolase deficiency
 Beta-galactosidase-1 deficiency
 Beta-mannosidosis
 Beta-sarcoglycanopathy
 Beta-thalassemia 
 Bethlem myopathy

Bh
 Bhaskar Jagannathan syndrome

Bi

Bib–Bil
 Bickel Fanconi glycogenosis
 Bicuspid aortic valve
 Bidirectional tachycardia
 Biemond syndrome
 Biemond syndrome type 1
 Biemond syndrome type 2
 Biermer disease
 Bifid nose dominant
 Bilateral renal agenesis dominant type
 Bilateral renal agenesis
 Biliary atresia, extrahepatic
 Biliary atresia, intrahepatic, non syndromic form
 Biliary atresia, intrahepatic, syndromic form
 Biliary atresia
 Biliary cirrhosis
 Biliary hypoplasia
 Biliary malformation renal tubular insufficiency
 Biliary tract cancer
 Billard Toutain Maheut syndrome
 Billet Bear syndrome

Bin–Bix
 Bindewald–Ulmer–Muller syndrome
 Binswanger's disease
 Bipolar disorder
 Bipolar I disorder
 Bipolar II disorder
 Biotin deficiency
 Biotinidase deficiency 
 Bird headed dwarfism Montreal type
 Birdshot chorioretinopathy
 Birt–Hogg–Dubé syndrome
 Bixler–Christian–Gorlin syndrome

Bj–Bk
 Björnstad syndrome
 BK virus nephritis

Bl

Bla–Ble
 Black piedra
 Bladder neoplasm
 Blamronesis
 Blaichman syndrome
 Blastoma
 Blastomycosis
 Blepharitis
 Blepharo cheilo dontic syndrome
 Blepharo facio skeletal syndrome
 Blepharo naso facial syndrome Van maldergem type
 Blepharonasofacial malformation syndrome
 Blepharophimosis nasal groove growth retardation
 Blepharophimosis ptosis esotropia syndactyly short
 Blepharophimosis ptosis syndactyly mental retardation
 Blepharophimosis syndrome Ohdo type
 Blepharophimosis, ptosis, epicanthus inversus
 Blepharophimosis
 Blepharoptosis aortic anomaly
 Blepharoptosis cleft palate ectrodactyly dental anomalies
 Blepharoptosis myopia ectopia lentis
 Blepharospasm
 Blethen–Wenick–Hawkins syndrome

Blo–Blu
 Blomstrand syndrome
 Blood coagulation disorders
 Blood platelet disorders
 Blood vessel disorder
 Bloom syndrome
 Blount's disease
 Blue cone monochromatism
 Blue diaper syndrome
 Blue rubber bleb nevus

Bo

Bod–Boo
 BOD syndrome
 Boder syndrome
 Body dysmorphic disorder
 Boil
 Bolivian hemorrhagic fever
 Bone development disorder
 Bone dysplasia Azouz type
 Bone dysplasia corpus callosum agenesis
 Bone dysplasia lethal Holmgren type
 Bone dysplasia Moore type
 Bone fragility craniosynostosis proptosis hydrocephalus
 Bone marrow failure neurologic abnormalities
 Bone marrow failure
 Bone neoplasms
 Bone tumor (generic term)
 Bonneau–Beaumont syndrome
 Bonneman–Meinecke–Reich syndrome
 Bonnemann–Meinecke syndrome
 Bonnevie–Ullrich–Turner syndrome
 Book syndrome
 Boomerang dysplasia
 Booth– Haworth–Dilling syndrome

Bor–Boy
 Borderline personality disorder
 Borjeson syndrome
 Bork–Stender–Schmidt syndrome
 Borreliosis
 Borrone–Di Rocco–Crovato syndrome
 Boscherini–Galasso–Manca–Bitti syndrome
 Bosma–Henkin–Christiansen syndrome
 Bothriocephalosis
 Botulism
 Boucher–Neuhauser syndrome
 Boudhina–Yedes–Khiari syndrome
 Bourneville's disease
 Bowen syndrome
 Bowen–Conradi syndrome
 Bowenoid papulosis
 Bowen's disease
 Bowing congenital short bones
 Bowing of long bones congenital
 Boylan–Dew–Greco syndrome

Br

Bra

Brac

Brach

Brachi–Brachm
 Brachioskeletogenital syndrome
 Brachman-de Lange syndrome

Brachy
Brachyc
 Brachycephalofrontonasal dysplasia
 Brachycephaly deafness cataract mental retardation
Brachyd
 Brachydactylous dwarfism Mseleni type
Brachydactyly
 Brachydactyly
Brachydactyly a – Brachydactyly s
 Brachydactyly absence of distal phalanges
 Brachydactyly anonychia
 Brachydactyly clinodactyly
 Brachydactyly dwarfism mental retardation
 Brachydactyly elbow wrist dysplasia
 Brachydactyly hypertension
 Brachydactyly long thumb type
 Brachydactyly mesomelia mental retardation heart defects
 Brachydactyly nystagmus cerebellar ataxia
 Brachydactyly preaxial hallux varus
 Brachydactyly scoliosis carpal fusion
 Brachydactyly small stature face anomalies
 Brachydactyly Smorgasbord type
Brachydactyly t
 Brachydactyly tibial hypoplasia
 Brachydactyly type A1
 Brachydactyly type A2
 Brachydactyly type A3
 Brachydactyly type A5 nail dysplasia
 Brachydactyly type A6
 Brachydactyly type A7
 Brachydactyly type B
 Brachydactyly type C
 Brachydactyly type D
 Brachydactyly type E
 Brachydactyly types B and E combined
Brachym–Brachyt
 Brachymesomelia renal syndrome
 Brachymesophalangy 2 and 5
 Brachymesophalangy mesomelic short limbs osseous anomalies
 Brachymesophalangy type 2
 Brachymetapody anodontia hypotrichosis albinoidism
 Brachymorphism onychodysplasia dysphalangism syndrome
 Brachyolmia recessive Hobaek type
 Brachyolmia
 Brachytelephalangy characteristic facies Kallmann

Brad–Braz
 Braddock–Carey syndrome
 Braddock–Jones–Superneau syndrome
 Bradykinesia
 Brain cavernous angioma
 Brain neoplasms
 Brain stem neoplasms
 Branchial arch defects
 Branchial arch syndrome X linked
 Branchio-oculo-facial syndrome Hing type
 Branchio-oculo-facial syndrome
 Branchio-oto-renal syndrome (BOR syndrome)
 Brazilian hemorrhagic fever

Bre–Bro
 Breast cancer
 Breast cancer, familial
 Brief psychotic disorder
 Bright's disease
 Brittle bone disease
 Brittle bone syndrome lethal type
 Brittle cornea syndrome
 Broad beta disease
 Broad-betalipoproteinemia
 Bromidrosiphobia
 Bronchiectasis
 Bronchiectasis oligospermia
 Bronchiolitis obliterans with obstructive pulmonary disease
 Bronchiolotis obliterans organizing pneumonia (BOOP)
 Bronchitis, Chronic
 Bronchogenic cyst
 Bronchopulmonary amyloidosis
 Bronchopulmonary dysplasia
 Brown syndrome
 Brown-Séquard syndrome

Bru
 Brucellosis
 Bruck syndrome
 Brugada syndrome
 Brunoni syndrome
 Bruton type agammaglobulinemia
 Bruyn Scheltens syndrome

Bu–Bz
 Bubonic plague
 Budd–Chiari syndrome
 Buerger's disease
 Bulbospinal amyotrophy, X-linked
 Bulimia nervosa
 Bull Nixon syndrome
 Bullous dystrophy macular type
 Bullous ichthyosiform erythroderma congenita
 Bullous pemphigoid
 Buntinx–Lormans–Martin syndrome
 Burkitt's lymphoma
 Burn–Goodship syndrome
 Burnett–Schwartz–Berberian syndrome
 Burning mouth syndrome- Type 3
 Burning mouth syndrome
 Buruli ulcer
 Buschke–Ollendorff syndrome
 Bustos–Simosa–Pinto–Cisternas syndrome
 Buttiens–Fryns syndrome
 Butyrylcholinesterase deficiency
 Byssinosis

References

B